The second Galan government, led by president Giancarlo Galan, was the government of Veneto from 6 June 2000 to 18 May 2005.
Source: Veneto Region

Governments of Veneto
2000 establishments in Italy
2005 disestablishments in Italy